Hungarian PEN Club is an affiliate of International PEN. The Hungarian Club was established in 1926 by Antal Radó. Early writers associated with the club included Albert Berzeviczy and Jenő Rákosi. Prominent members include Zsolt Harsányi, Miklós Hubay, Dezső Kosztolányi, Sándor Márai, Árpád Göncz, Gábor Görgey, and Zoltán Sumonyi.

Janus Pannonius Grand Prize for Poetry

In 2012, the club established a new literary award for International poetry called the Janus Pannonius International Poetry Prize, later renamed the Grand Prize for Poetry. It includes a prize of  funded by the Hungarian government. The award is named in honor of Hungarian poet Janus Pannonius (1434-1472) and is presented yearly on his birthday, August 29.

In 2012, the inaugural award was rejected by American recipient Lawrence Ferlinghetti due to concerns over human rights issues in Hungary under Prime Minister Viktor Orbán, since the award is sponsored by the Hungarian government. Ferlinghetti wrote that "Since the policies of this right-wing regime tend toward authoritarian rule and the consequent curtailing of freedom of expression and civil liberties, I find it impossible for me to accept the Prize in the United States. Thus, I must refuse the prize in its presents terms." In 2013, the club announced that "To avoid similar concerns in the future, the financial part of the prize has been sourced from private donations alone."

Honorees
2012
Grand Prize: Lawrence Ferlinghetti (United States)
Translation prize: Ithamar Jáoz-ready (Israel) and Javorsky Bela (Hungary)

2013
Grand Prize: Simin Behbahani (Iran)
Translation Prize: László Márton
Translation Prize: Péter Rácz

2014
Grand Prize: Adunis (Adonis) (Syria)
Grand Prize: Yves Bonnefoy (France)
Translation Prize: Zoltán Csehy
Lifetime Award for Translation: György Gömöri
2015
Grand Prize: Charles Bernstein (United States)
Grand Prize: Giuseppe Conte (Italy)
Translation Prize: Wilhelm Droste
Lifetime Award for Translation: Ádám Makkai

2016
Grand Prize: Adam Zagajewski
Translation Prize: Gyula Kodolányi
Lifetime Award for Translation: Pál Sohár
Filius Ursae Award: János Dénes Orbán

2017
Grand Prize: Augusto de Campos
Translation Prize: Ádám Nádasdy
Translation Prize: Hans-Henning Paetzke
Filius Ursae Award: Katalin Ladik

2018

Grand Prize: Yang Lian
Translation Prize: Clive Wilmer
Translation Prize: Pál Ferenc
Filius Ursae Award: Sántha Attila

2019
Grand Prize: Clara Janés Nadal
Translation Prize: Judit Vihar
Translation Prize: Gilevszki Paszkal
Filius Ursae Award: Zsolt Győrei

References

External links
PEN International - Hungarian PEN Centre honlapja

International PEN centers
Hungarian literature